Natimuk is a town in Western Victoria, Australia. At the 2016 census, Natimuk had a population of 514, up from 449 in 2006.

History
The local post office opened as "Natimuk Creek" on 1 July 1874 and was renamed "Natimuk" in 1884.

A railway line, built in a number of sections, once connected Horsham and Hamilton, running via Cavendish, Balmoral and East Natimuk until their closures in 1986 and 1988.

The Natimuk Court of Petty Sessions closed in 1965, with the former courthouse subsequently being used by the local historical society.

In 2004 Natimuk hosted 10000 people for Triple J's One Night Stand.

Description
Natimuk has traditionally survived as a rural service centre for the surrounding grain and sheep farming community. More recently it has diversified into tourism and staved off the decline common in other Wimmera towns. People from all over the planet flock to Natimuk because of the rock climbing at Mount Arapiles and the nearby Grampians.

Around 60 rock climbers (locally known as goats) have made Natimuk their home due to the climbing and lifestyle.  Every two years Natimuk hosts its arts festival, the Nati Frinj. Natimuk's arts friendly focus has attracted and supported artists from nearby regions or urban areas to settle in the town.

Sport
The town has traditionally had strong Netball teams - The Ewes. Natimuk also fields three or four Australian Rules teams who compete in the Horsham & District Football League.

Golfers play at the course of the Natimuk Golf Club at Mount Arapiles State Park.

There is also a lawn bowls club, tennis club, cricket club and people come from miles around to compete and train with the Natimuk Gymnastics Club.

Environment

There are many small wetlands in the district, and the town lies close to the Natimuk-Douglas Wetlands Important Bird Area, so identified by BirdLife International because of its importance for a variety of waterbirds.

Events
Nati Frinj is hosted in the first weekend of November during each odd numbered year in town. The festival includes music, food, visual art, performances, and various other events. Natimuk also hosts Goatfest, an annual climbing film festival, which coincides with the influx of climbers over the Easter holidays.

References

External links

Information about Natimuk and the Nati Frinj

Towns in Victoria (Australia)
Rural City of Horsham
Wimmera